is a Japanese fencer. He competed in the individual and team foil events at the 1964 and 1968 Summer Olympics.

References

External links
 

1940 births
Living people
Japanese male foil fencers
Olympic fencers of Japan
Fencers at the 1964 Summer Olympics
Fencers at the 1968 Summer Olympics
Sportspeople from Shiga Prefecture
20th-century Japanese people